Clofoctol is a bacteriostatic antibiotic. It is used in the treatment of respiratory tract and ear, nose and throat infections caused by Gram-positive bacteria.
It has been marketed in France till 2005 under the trade name Octofene and in Italy as Gramplus.

It is only functional against Gram-positive bacteria.

It penetrates into human lung tissue.

Apteeus is developing clofoctol as a potential therapy against SARS-CoV-2.

References

Antibiotics
Phenols
Chloroarenes